The Civic People's Convergence (Convergencia Popular Cívica) is a progressive political party in Colombia. 
At the last legislative elections, 10 March 2002, the party won as one of the many small parties parliamentary representation. 

Progressive parties in Colombia